The Serra Grande Gold Mine is a gold mine located 5 km from Crixás, in the Goiás state of Brazil. It is jointly owned by AngloGold Ashanti and Kinross Gold Corporation, who are equal partners. The mine is operated by AngloGold Ashanti but revenue is spread evenly between the two companies.

In 2008, the Brazilian operations contributed 8% to AngloGold Ashanti's overall production. It is one of two mining operations of the company in Brazil, the other being the Brasil Mineração Gold Mine.

History
Exploration work on the current Serra Grande mine begun in 1973 and detailed mapping and diamond drilling was conducted until 1976. Mining however did not start until 1987.

Kinross Gold acquired fifty percent of the operation in January 2003 through a merger with TVX.

Serra Grande currently comprises three underground mines: Mina III, Mina Nova, and Palmeiras, the later being the most recent development. An open pit also exists above Mina III.

The mine experienced one fatality in 2008 but has been fatality free in 2009.

Production
Recent production figures of the mine were:

References

External links 
 Kinross Gold website
 AngloGold Ashanti website
 AngloGold Ashanti: Country report Brazil

Gold mines in Brazil
Underground mines in Brazil
Surface mines in Brazil
AngloGold Ashanti
Buildings and structures in Goiás